Gigi Fernández and Lori McNeil were the defending champions but lost in the final 6–4, 6–3 against Rosalyn Fairbank and Barbara Potter.

Seeds
Champion seeds are indicated in bold text while text in italics indicates the round in which those seeds were eliminated.

 Gigi Fernández /  Lori McNeil (final)
 Rosalyn Fairbank /  Barbara Potter (champions)
 Katrina Adams /  Carin Bakkum (semifinals)
 Gretchen Magers /  Wendy White (quarterfinals)

Draw

References
 1988 Virginia Slims of Newport Doubles Draw

Virginia Slims of Newport
1988 WTA Tour
1988 Hall of Fame Tennis Championships